The Massacre of Glencoe took place in Glen Coe in the Highlands of Scotland on 13 February 1692. An estimated 30 members and associates of Clan MacDonald of Glencoe were killed by Scottish government forces, allegedly for failing to pledge allegiance to the new monarchs, William III and Mary II.

Although the Jacobite rising of 1689 was no longer a serious threat by May 1690, continuing unrest in the Highlands consumed military resources needed for the Nine Years' War in Flanders. In late 1690, the Scottish government agreed to pay the Jacobite clan chiefs a total of £12,000 in return for an oath of loyalty to William and Mary; however, disagreements over dividing the money meant by December 1691 none of them had taken the oath. 

Under pressure from William, Secretary of State Lord Stair decided to make an example as a warning of the consequences for further delay. The Glencoe MacDonalds were not the only ones who failed to meet the deadline, as the Keppoch MacDonalds did not swear until early February. The precise reasons why they were selected for punishment are still debated, but appear to have been a combination of internal clan politics and a reputation for lawlessness that made them an easy target.

While there are many examples of similar events in earlier Scottish history, by 1692 such incidents were increasingly rare and the brutality of the massacre shocked contemporaries. It became a significant element in the persistence of Jacobitism in the Highlands during the first half of the 18th century, and remains a powerful symbol for a variety of reasons.

Background 
Some historians argue the late 17th-century Scottish Highlands were more peaceful than often suggested, in part because chiefs could be fined for crimes committed by their clansmen. The exception was the area known as Lochaber, identified as a refuge for cattle raiders and thieves by government officials, other chiefs and Gaelic poets. Four Lochaber clans were consistently named in such accounts; the Glencoe and Keppoch MacDonalds, the MacGregors and the Camerons.

Levies from all four served in the Independent Companies used to suppress the Conventicles in 1678–80, and took part in the devastating Atholl raid that followed Argyll's Rising in 1685. Primarily directed against areas in Cowal and Kintyre settled by Lowland migrants, it destabilised large parts of the central and southern Highlands. As a result, the government had to use military force to restore order; before James VII and II was deposed by the November 1688 Glorious Revolution, he outlawed the Keppoch MacDonalds for attacking his troops.

When James landed in Ireland to regain his kingdoms in March 1689, the Camerons and Keppoch MacDonalds joined a small force recruited by Viscount Dundee for a supporting campaign in Scotland. Dundee and 600 Highlanders died in the victory at Killiecrankie on 27 July; although organised Jacobite resistance ended after Cromdale in May 1690, much of the Highlands remained out of government hands. Policing it used resources needed for the Nine Years' War in Flanders, while close links between Western Scotland and Ulster meant unrest in one country often spilled into the other. As peace in the Highlands required control of Lochaber, the region had far wider strategic importance than it appears.

Oath of allegiance to William and Mary

After Killiecrankie, the Scottish government tried to negotiate a settlement with the Jacobite chiefs,  terms varying based on events in Ireland and Scotland. In March 1690, Secretary of State Lord Stair offered them a total of £12,000 in return for swearing an Oath of allegiance to William. The chiefs agreed to do so in the June 1691 Declaration of Achallader, with the Earl of Breadalbane signing for the government. Crucially, it did not specify how the money was to be divided and disputes over this delayed the oath, with Breadalbane arguing part of it was owed him as compensation for damage done to his estates by the Glencoe MacDonalds.

The Battle of Aughrim on 12 July ended Jacobite chances of victory in the Williamite War in Ireland, and any immediate prospects of a Stuart restoration. On 26 August, the Scottish government issued a Royal Proclamation that offered a pardon to anyone taking the Oath prior to 1 January 1692, with severe reprisals for those who did not. Two days later, secret articles began circulating which cancelled the Achallader agreement in the event of a Jacobite invasion and were allegedly signed by all the attendees. These included Breadalbane, who claimed they had been manufactured by the MacDonald chief Glengarry. From this point on, Stair's letters focused on enforcement, reflecting his belief that forged or not, none of the signatories intended to keep their word.

In early October, the chiefs asked James for permission to swear unless he could mount an invasion before the deadline, a condition they knew was impossible. A document granting his approval was sent from the exile court in Saint-Germain on 12 December and received by Glengarry on the 23rd. He delayed sharing it with his colleagues until 28 December for reasons that remain unclear, although one suggestion is that it was driven by a power struggle within the MacDonald clan between Episcopalian elements like Glencoe and the Catholic minority, led by Glengarry. As a result, it was not until 30 December that MacIain of Glencoe left for Fort William to take the oath from its governor, Lieutenant Colonel John Hill. Since he was not authorised to accept it, Hill sent MacIain to Inverary with a letter for Sir Colin Campbell, the local magistrate. He administered the oath on 6 January, after which MacIain returned home. 

Although Glengarry did not swear until 4 February, while others did so by proxy, only MacIain was excluded from the indemnity issued by the Scottish Privy Council. Stair's letter of 2 December to Breadalbane shows the decision to make an example was taken well before the deadline for the oath, originally as a much bigger operation; '...the clan Donell must be rooted out and Lochiel. Leave the McLeans to Argyll...' 

In January, he wrote three letters in quick succession to Sir Thomas Livingstone, military commander in Scotland; on 7th, the intention was to '....destroy entirely the country of Lochaber, Locheal's lands, Kippochs, Glengarrie and Glenco...;' on 9th '...their chieftains all being papists, it is well the vengeance falls there; for my part, I regret the MacDonalds had not divided and...Kippoch and Glenco are safe.' The last on 11 January states; '...my lord Argile tells me Glenco hath not taken the oaths at which I rejoice....'

The Scottish Parliament passed a Decree of Forfeiture in 1690, depriving Glengarry of his lands, but he continued to hold Invergarry Castle, whose garrison included the senior Jacobite officers Alexander Cannon and Thomas Buchan. This suggests the Episcopalian Glencoe MacDonalds only replaced the Catholic Glengarry as the target on 11 January; MacIain's son John MacDonald told the 1695 Commission the soldiers came to Glencoe from the north '...Glengarry's house being reduced.'

The targeting of the Glencoe MacDonalds was driven by a variety of factors and motives. After two years of negotiations, Stair was under pressure to ensure the deal stuck, while Argyll was competing for political influence with his kinsman Breadalbane, who also found it expedient to concur with the plan. Glengarry was later pardoned and his lands returned, while maintaining his reputation at the Jacobite court by being the last to swear and ensuring Cannon and Buchan received safe conduct to France in March 1692.

Massacre

In late January 1692, two companies or approximately 120 men from the Earl of Argyll's Regiment of Foot arrived in Glencoe from Invergarry. Their commander was Robert Campbell of Glenlyon, an impoverished local landowner whose niece was married to one of MacIain's sons. Campbell carried orders for 'free quarter', an established alternative to paying taxes in what was a largely non-cash society. The Glencoe MacDonalds had themselves been similarly billeted on the Campbells when serving with the Highland levies used to police Argyll in 1678.

Highland regiments were formed by first appointing Captains, each responsible for recruiting sixty men from his own estates. Muster rolls for the regiment from October 1691 show the vast majority came from areas in Argyll devastated by the 1685 and 1686 Atholl. On 12 February, Hill ordered Lieutenant Colonel James Hamilton to take 400 men and block the northern exits from Glencoe at Kinlochleven. Meanwhile, another 400 men under Major Duncanson would join Glenlyon's detachment and sweep northwards up the glen, killing anyone they found, removing property and burning houses.

On the evening of 12 February, Glenlyon received written orders from Duncanson carried by another Argyll officer, Captain Thomas Drummond; their tone shows doubts as to his ability or willingness to carry them out.
'See that this be putt in execution without feud or favour, else you may expect to be dealt with as one not true to King nor Government, nor a man fitt to carry Commissione in the Kings service.' As Captain of the Argylls' Grenadier company, Drummond was senior to Glenlyon; his presence appears to have been to ensure the orders were enforced, since witnesses later gave evidence he shot two people who asked Glenlyon for mercy.

In his letters of 30 January to Lieutenant Colonel Hamilton and Colonel Hill, Stair expresses concern the MacDonalds would escape if warned, and emphasises the need for secrecy. This correlates with evidence from James Campbell, one of Glenlyon's company, stating they had no knowledge of the plan until the morning of 13 February. MacIain was killed but his two sons escaped and the 1695 Commission was given various figures for the number of casualties; the often quoted figure of 38 is based on hearsay evidence from Hamilton's men, while the MacDonalds themselves claimed 'the number they knew to be slaine were about 25.' Modern research estimates deaths resulting from the Massacre as 'around 30', while claims others died of exposure have not been substantiated.

Casualties would have been higher but whether by accident or design, Hamilton and Duncanson arrived after the killings had finished. Duncanson was two hours late, only joining Glenlyon at the southern end at 7:00 am, after which they advanced up the glen burning houses and removing livestock. Hamilton was not in position at Kinlochleven until 11:00; his detachment included two lieutenants, Francis Farquhar and Gilbert Kennedy who often appear in anecdotes claiming they 'broke their swords rather than carry out their orders.' This differs from their testimony to the Commission and is unlikely since they arrived hours after the killings, which were carried out at the opposite end of the glen.

In May, fears of a French invasion meant the Argylls were posted to Brentford in England, then Flanders, where they served until the end of the Nine Years' War in 1697 when the regiment was disbanded. No action was taken against those involved; Glenlyon died of disease in Bruges in August 1696, Duncanson was killed in Spain in May 1705 while Drummond survived to take part in another famous Scottish disaster, the Darien scheme.

Investigation
On 12 April 1692, the Paris Gazette published a copy of Glenlyon's orders, allegedly found in an Edinburgh tavern and taken to France. Despite criticism of the government, there was little sympathy for the MacDonalds, Livingstone writing 'it's not that anyone thinks the thieving tribe did not deserve to be destroyed, but that it should have been done by those quartered amongst them makes a great noise.' The motivation for investigating the affair was largely political; having served both the old and new regimes, Stair was widely unpopular.

In the debate that followed, Colonel Hill claimed most Highlanders were peaceful, and even in Lochaber,  He argued lawlessness was deliberately encouraged by leaders like Glengarry, while 'the midle sort of Gentrey and Commons....never got anything but hurt' from it. The 1693 Highland Judicial Commission tried to encourage the use of the law to resolve issues like cattle theft, but it was undermined by the clan chiefs, as it reduced control over their tenants.

The issue appeared settled until May 1695, when the English Licensing of the Press Act 1662 expired, leading to an explosion in the number of political pamphlets published in London. These included Gallienus Redivivus, or Murther will out, &c. Being a true Account of the De Witting of Glencoe, Gaffney, written by Jacobite-activist Charles Leslie. Its focus was on William's alleged complicity in the 1672 death of Johan de Witt, with Glencoe and other crimes as secondary charges.

A Commission was set up to determine whether there was a case to answer under 'Slaughter under trust', a 1587 act intended to reduce endemic feuding. The law applied to murder committed in "cold-blood", for example when articles of surrender had been agreed, or hospitality accepted. It was first used in 1588 against Lachlan Mor Maclean, whose objections to his mother's second marriage led him to murder his new stepfather, John MacDonald, and 18 members of the wedding party. Interpretation varied, for example the cases of James MacDonald, who locked his parents inside their house before setting fire to it in 1597, and the killing of prisoners after the 1647 Battle of Dunaverty. Both were deemed to have been committed in "hot blood", and thus excluded.

As a capital offence and treason, it was an awkward weapon with which to attack Stair, since William himself signed the orders and the intent was widely known in government circles. The Commission instead considered whether participants had exceeded orders, not their legality, and concluded Stair and Hamilton had a case to answer, but left the decision to William. While Stair was dismissed as Secretary of State, he returned to government in 1700 and was made an earl by the last Stuart monarch, Queen Anne. An application by the survivors for compensation was ignored; they rebuilt their houses, and participated in the 1715 and 1745 Jacobite risings. An archaeological survey in 2019 showed Glencoe was occupied until the Highland Clearances of the mid-18th century.

Aftermath 

The brutality of the Massacre shocked Scottish society and became a Jacobite symbol of post-1688 oppression; in 1745, Prince Charles ordered Leslie's pamphlet and the 1695 Parliamentary minutes reprinted in the Edinburgh Caledonian Mercury. It then largely disappeared from public view until 1850 when it was referenced by Whig historian Thomas Macaulay in his History. He sought to exonerate William from every charge made by Leslie and is responsible for the suggestion that the Massacre was part of a feud between the MacDonalds and Clan Campbell.

Victorian Scotland developed values that were pro-Union and pro-Empire, while also being uniquely Scottish. Historical divisions meant this was largely expressed through a shared cultural identity, while the study of Scottish history itself virtually disappeared from universities. Glencoe became part of a focus on 'the emotional trappings of the Scottish past...bonnie Scotland of the bens and glens and misty shieling, the Jacobites, Mary, Queen of Scots, tartan mania and the raising of historical statuary.'

After the study of Scottish history re-emerged in the 1950s, Leslie's perspectives continued to shape views of William's reign as particularly disastrous for Scotland. The massacre was only one in a series of incidents deemed as such, including the Darien scheme, the famine of the late 1690s, and the Union of 1707. It is still commemorated in an annual ceremony by the Clan Donald Society; initiated in 1930, this is held at the Upper Carnoch memorial, a tapering Celtic cross installed in 1883 at the eastern end of Glencoe village. Another memorial includes the Henderson Stone, a granite boulder south of Carnach; originally known as the 'Soldier's Stone', in the late 19th century, it was renamed Clach Eanruig, or 'Henry's Stone', after the man reputed to be Piper to MacIain.

In popular culture 

Glencoe was a popular topic with 19th-century poets, notably Sir Walter Scott's "Massacre of Glencoe". It was used as a subject by Thomas Campbell and George Gilfillan, as well as by Letitia Elizabeth Landon in her 1823 work "Glencoe", T. S. Eliot's "Rannoch, by Glencoe" and "Two Poems from Glencoe" by Douglas Stewart.

In music, The Corries recorded and popularized "The Massacre of Glencoe, a ballad that tells the tale from a Highlander perspective. 

Examples in literature include "The Masks of Purpose" by Eric Linklater, and the novels Fire Bringer by David Clement-Davies, Corrag (known as Witch Light in paperback) by Susan Fletcher and Lady of the Glen by Jennifer Roberson. William Croft Dickinson references Glencoe in his 1963 short story "The Return of the Native". A Song of Ice and Fire author, George R. R. Martin, cites the Glencoe Massacre as one of two historical influences on the infamous "Red Wedding" in his 2000 book A Storm of Swords.

In the television series Mad Men, it is implied that the Campbell–MacDonald feud is still active as of 1969, when Pete Campbell's daughter is rejected from an elite New York preschool headed by a MacDonald.

Recent archaeological work
After the Massacre, the Glencoe MacDonalds rebuilt their homes; a military survey undertaken between 1747 and 1755 shows seven separate settlements along the glen, each containing between six and eleven buildings. In 2018, a team of archaeologists organised by the National Trust for Scotland began surveying several areas related to the massacre, with plans to produce detailed studies of their findings. Work in the summer of 2019 focused on the settlement of Achadh Triachatain, or Achtriachtan, at the extreme end of the glen; home to an estimated 50 people, excavations show it was rebuilt after 1692 and still occupied in the mid-18th century. No artefacts relating to the massacre have as yet been found.

Explanatory notes

References

Sources
 
 
 
 
 
 
 
 
 
 
 
 
 
 
 
 
 
 ;
 
 
 
 Leslie, Charles; Gallienus Redivivus, or Murther will out, &c. Being a true Account of the De Witting of Glencoe, (Gaffney, 1695);
 
 
 ;

External links 
 
 Report of the Commission given by his majesty, for inquiring into the slaughter of the men of Glenco subscribed at Halyrud-house the 20th day of June, 1693;
 History – Massacre of Glencoe 1692 – BBC: brief account of the massacre
 Macaulay's History of England, chapter XVIII Includes a well-written and moderately detailed account of the massacre in its political context, with footnotes to original source documents. However, it should be read with caution as Macaulay had a very specific perspective.
 Glen Coe Massacre Detailed account of the events leading up to the massacre and the massacre itself.
 Glencoe Very detailed and balanced account of the plot and massacre.
 The Vale of Glencoe Radio episode from the series Quiet, Please. Poor sound quality, but the radio script may be found below.
 The Vale of Glencoe Radio Script OTR Plot Spot—plot summaries, scripts and reviews of Old Time Radio shows, including "The Vale of Glencoe", above.

 

1692 in Scotland
Glen Coe
History of the Scottish Highlands
Jacobite rising of 1689
Massacres in 1692
Massacres in Scotland
Political scandals in Scotland